Baishatan is a town in Rushan, Weihai, in eastern Shandong province, China.

References

Township-level divisions of Shandong